Josh Campbell (born August 31, 1983) is an American correspondent with CNN, former U.S. intelligence community official, and military veteran. He serves as an adjunct senior fellow and national security policy researcher with the Center for a New American Security.

Campbell previously served as a Supervisory Special Agent with the U.S. Federal Bureau of Investigation conducting national security and criminal investigations. His assignments included deploying in response to international terrorist attacks and kidnappings, overseas tours embedded with the CIA, U.S. Special Operations Command, and Department of State, crisis communication manager for counterterrorism, cyber and counterintelligence investigations, and was appointed Special Assistant to the FBI Director. He was awarded four FBI Combat Theater awards for his work overseas in conflict zones.

He is known for covering breaking news events involving national security matters, and reporting domestically and internationally on law enforcement issues. In addition to on-air work, he regularly contributes to CNN.com, and has been published in The New York Times, The Washington Post, and USA Today. He is also the author of Crossfire Hurricane: Inside Donald Trump's War on Justice and the FBI.

Campbell grew up in Texas, and received a B.A. in Government from The University of Texas at Austin. He received an M.A. in Communication from Johns Hopkins University and completed the Middlebury College Arabic language immersion program. Campbell is a term member with the Council on Foreign Relations, an officer in the Navy Reserve, and taught digital and national security at The University of Southern California.

Personal life 
Campbell married his husband on July 4, 2019.

See also
Crossfire Hurricane (FBI investigation)

References 

1983 births
Living people
American male journalists
CNN people
American television reporters and correspondents
University of Texas at Austin College of Liberal Arts alumni
Johns Hopkins University alumni
American law enforcement officials
Federal Bureau of Investigation agents
People from Austin, Texas
American LGBT journalists